Parliamentary elections were held in Chile on 22 November 1925. The Liberal Party emerged as the largest party in the Chamber of Deputies, winning 43 of the 132 seats.

Results

Chamber of Deputies

References

Elections in Chile
1925 in Chile
Chile
November 1925 events
Election and referendum articles with incomplete results